The 2019 Furman Paladins team represented Furman University as a member of the Southern Conference (SoCon) during the 2019 NCAA Division I FCS football season. Led by third-year head coach Clay Hendrix, the Paladins compiled an overall record of 8–5 with a mark of 6–2 in conference play, placing second in the SoCon. Furman received an at-large bid to the NCAA Division I Football Championship playoffs, where they lost to Austin Peay in the first round. The team played home games at Paladin Stadium in Greenville, South Carolina.

Previous season

The Paladins finished the 2018 season 6–4, 6–2 in SoCon play finish in a three way tie for the SoCon championship with Wofford and East Tennessee State. After tiebreakers, they did not receive the SoCon's automatic bid to the FCS playoffs and they did not receive an at-large bid.

Preseason

Preseason polls
The SoCon released their preseason media poll and coaches poll on July 22, 2019. The Paladins were picked to finish in second place in both polls.

Preseason All-SoCon Teams
The Paladins placed seven players on the preseason all-SoCon teams.

Offense

1st team

Bo Layton – OL

2nd team

Devin Wynn – RB

Andy Godwin – OL

Thomas Gordon – WR

Defense

1st team

Adrian Hope – LB

2nd team

Elijah McKoy – LB

Specialists

1st team

Grayson Atkins – K

Schedule

Game summaries

Charleston Southern

at Georgia State

at Virginia Tech

Mercer

East Tennessee State

at Samford

The Citadel

at Western Carolina

at Chattanooga

VMI

at Wofford

Point

at Austin Peay—FCS First Round

The Paladins were selected for the postseason tournament, with a first-round pairing against Austin Peay.

Rankings

References

Furman
Furman Paladins football seasons
Furman
Furman Paladins football